Megadisocosorus is a genus of actinocerid cephalopods similar to Armenoceras but with a short, slightly curved, breviconic shell. The siphuncle is in contact with the ventral wall, unlike that of Armenoceras in which the siphuncle is close to the center.

Megadisocosorus is known from the Middle Silurian of North America. According to Teichert, 1964, Megadisocosorus is a member of one of the two branches of the Armenoceratidae that also includes Nybyoceras and Selkirkoceras.

References

 Curt Teichert, 1964. Actinoceratoidea, Treatise on Invertebrate Paleontology, Part K. Geological Society of America and University of Kansas Press.

Prehistoric nautiloid genera
Actinocerida